Marianne Reilly is the current director of athletics for Manhattan College. She previously served as an associate athletic director at Fordham University 1996 to 2016. Reilly attended college at Manhattan College, where she played on the school's women's basketball team. Reilly was named athletic director at Manhattan College on March 30, 2016.

References

External links
Manhattan profile

Living people
Fordham Rams women's basketball coaches
Manhattan Lady Jaspers basketball players
Manhattan Jaspers and Lady Jaspers athletic directors
Women college athletic directors in the United States
Year of birth missing (living people)